A war commissary or armed forces commissary (German: Kriegskommissar, French:commissaire des armées) is a military official responsible for supplying military arms and provisions, and sometimes in charge of the military budget and conscription.  The rank is used, or has been used,  in the Danish Army, Norwegian Army, Prussian Army, Swedish Army, French Army and Soviet army.

Russia
In the Soviet Union, the war commissary was a direct political representative of the Soviet Government with the army.

Sweden
Hans Detterman Cronman (1590–c1645)

Prussia 
The title was later called the Prussian Minister of War in 1808
 Wilhelm von Rath (1585–1641)
 Wedego von Bonin
 Johann Friedrich Adolf von der Marwitz (1723–1781)

See also 
 Political commissar
 Prussian Minister of War
 United States Secretary of Defense

References

Commissars